Nouredine el Fahtni (also Noreddine el Fahtni), is Moroccan who is a suspected member of terrorist organisation Hofstad Network, a Dutch organisation agitating for jihad against parliamentary democracy and the foundation of an Islamic state.

El Fahtni was arrested in Portugal in the summer of 2004, during the European Football Championship, on suspicion of planning an attack on then Portuguese prime minister José Manuel Durão Barroso, but was released for insufficient evidence. In 2005, El Fahtni and his wife Soumaya S. were arrested in the Netherlands for possessing a loaded machine gun, for which S. received a nine-month sentence and El Fahtni five years. Prosecutors sought a 12-year sentence for El Fahtni's suspected involvement in the "Piranha terrorism plot" against politicians and the Dutch Secret Service, AIVD. On 1 December 2006, he was sentenced to four years imprisonment, while co-conspirators Mohammed Chentouf also received four years and Samir Azzouz eight years.

Further reading
Van Gogh killer begins presenting own defense in new terrorism case Asharq Alawsat
 Rechtbank heeft uitspraak gedaan in zaken verdachten Hofstadgroep (Dutch). de Rechtspraak.

References

 

Dutch Islamists
Moroccan emigrants to the Netherlands
Hofstad Network
Terrorism in Portugal
Muslims with branch missing
Living people
1982 births